Clyde Gilman Doyle (July 11, 1887 – March 14, 1963) was an American lawyer and politician who served as a United States representative from California in the mid-20th century.

Biography 
Clyde Doyle was born in Oakland, Alameda County, California and attended public schools in Oakland, Seattle, Washington, Los Angeles and Long Beach, California. Graduated from the College of Law of the University of Southern California at Los Angeles in 1917, he was admitted to the bar and commenced practice in Long Beach, California. He was a member and president of the Board of Freeholders, Long Beach, California in 1921 and 1922.

Doyle was a member of the California State Board of Education. Elected as a Democrat to the Seventy-ninth Congress (January 3, 1945 – January 3, 1947), he failed to gain reelection to the Eightieth Congress in 1946 but successfully regained his seat for the Eighty-first—and to seven succeeding Congresses.  He thus served continuously from January 3, 1949, until his death in Arlington, Virginia on March 14, 1963.

Doyle also served on the House Un-American Activities Committee from 1951 until his death in 1963.  His role on the committee is recalled unflatteringly in Beat Generation poet and fellow Californian Lawrence Ferlinghetti's 1958 poem "Dog" (published in his celebrated collection A Coney Island of the Mind):

But he has his own free world to live in
His own fleas to eat
He will not be muzzled
Congressman Doyle is just another
fire hydrant
to him

See also
 List of United States Congress members who died in office (1950–99)

References

1887 births
1963 deaths
Democratic Party members of the United States House of Representatives from California
USC Gould School of Law alumni
American Congregationalists
People from Oakland, California
School board members in California
20th-century American politicians
American anti-communists